Tetanura is a genus of flies in the family Sciomyzidae, the marsh flies or snail-killing flies.

Species
T. fallenii Hendel, 1924
T. pallidiventris Fallén, 1820

References

Sciomyzidae
Sciomyzoidea genera